Chernicheno is a rural locality in Belyayevsky Selsoviet Rural Settlement, Konyshyovsky District, Kursk Oblast, Russia. Population:

Geography 
The village is located on the Rzhavets Brook (a left tributary of the Vandarets River in the Svapa River basin), 52 km from the Russia–Ukraine border, 71 km north-west of Kursk, 8 km north-west of the district center – the urban-type settlement Konyshyovka, 4 km from the selsoviet center – Belyayevo.

 Climate
Chernicheno has a warm-summer humid continental climate (Dfb in the Köppen climate classification).

Transport 
Chernicheno is located 47.5 km from the federal route  Ukraine Highway, 50 km from the route  Crimea Highway, 33 km from the route  (Trosna – M3 highway), 22 km from the road of regional importance  (Fatezh – Dmitriyev), 8.5 km from the road  (Konyshyovka – Zhigayevo – 38K-038), 18 km from the road  (Dmitriyev – Beryoza – Menshikovo – Khomutovka), 6 km from the road  (Lgov – Konyshyovka), on the road of intermunicipal significance  (Konyshyovka – Makaro-Petrovskoye, with the access road to the villages of Belyayevo and Chernicheno), 8 km from the nearest railway station Konyshyovka (railway line Navlya – Lgov-Kiyevsky).

The rural locality is situated 71 km from Kursk Vostochny Airport, 165 km from Belgorod International Airport and 279 km from Voronezh Peter the Great Airport.

References

Notes

Sources

Rural localities in Konyshyovsky District